On 2 May 1953, BOAC Flight 783, a de Havilland Comet jetliner registered G-ALYV and operated by British Overseas Airways Corporation, broke up mid-air and crashed after encountering a severe squall, shortly after taking off from Calcutta (now Kolkata), India. All 43 passengers and crew on board were killed.

The crash was followed in less than a year by two more fatal accidents involving structural failure of Comet aircraft: BOAC Flight 781 and South African Airways Flight 201, after which the entire fleet was grounded until extensive redesign of the type was carried out, leading to the development of the Comet 2 version.

History of the flight 
Flight 783 had originated in Singapore and was a service to London. After a scheduled stopover at Calcutta's Dum Dum Airport (now Netaji Subhas Chandra Bose International Airport), the aircraft departed on 2 May at 16:29 local time (10:59 GMT) on its next segment to Delhi.

Severe rain and thunderstorms were present in the area.

The wreckage of G-ALYV was later found strewn along a  track, with the main parts still on fire. There were no survivors.

Victims 
The 43 people on board were 6 crew members and 37 passengers of British, American, Australian, Burmese and Filipino nationalities. Among the victims were Australian politician Trevor Oldham and his wife.

Investigation 
The subsequent investigation found that, after encountering a squall, the aircraft "suffered structural failure in the air which caused fire." The probable cause of the failure was reported as "overstressing which resulted from either: severe gusts encountered in the thundersquall, or overcontrolling or loss of control by the pilot when flying through the thunderstorm."

The investigators also recommended "to consider if any modification to the structure of the Comet is necessary."

References

External links
 Accident report – Report by N.S. Lokur, republished in the United Kingdom by the Ministry of Civil Aviation

Accidents and incidents involving the de Havilland Comet
Flight 783
Airliner accidents and incidents caused by in-flight structural failure
Aviation accidents and incidents in India
Aviation accidents and incidents in 1953
May 1953 events in Asia
1953 in India